Fourth state or Fourth State may refer to:
The Fourth State, 2012 German film
The fourth state of matter
Georgia (U.S. state), one of the original Thirteen Colonies, and the fourth to ratify the Constitution of the United States of America in 1788
Puebla, admitted to the United Mexican States as its fourth state in 1823

See also

Fourth Estate